Prunus ilicifolia (Common names: hollyleaf cherry, evergreen cherry; islay - Salinan Native American) is native to the chaparral areas of coastal California (from Mendocino County to San Diego County), Baja California, and Baja California Sur. as well as the desert chaparral areas of the Mojave desert.

Prunus ilicifolia is an evergreen shrub to tree, producing edible cherries, with shiny and spiny toothed leaves similar in appearance to those of holly. This resemblance is the source of both the common name "holly-leaved cherry" and the scientific epithet "ilicifolia" (Ilex-leaved). It has small white flowers growing in clusters, similar in appearance to most members of the rose family, Rosaceae, flowering from March to May. The flowers are terminal on small stalks, with the youngest at the cluster center. The purple to black fruit is sweet, with a very thin pulp around a large single stone (drupe).

The plant is prized for cultivation, showy and easily grown from seed, and has been cultivated for centuries as a food source, and tolerates twice yearly pruning when often used as a hedge. The plant likes full sun, loose open soil (porous), and tolerates drought conditions well, but needs regular watering when young.

Despite its name, it is not a true cherry (P. subg. Cerasus) species. It is traditionally included in P. subg. Laurocerasus, but molecular research indicates it is nested with species of P. subg. Padus. Ilicifolia or “ilex foliage,” means “holly-like leaves” in Latin

Description

It is an evergreen shrub or small tree approaching  in height, with dense, hard leaves (sclerophyllous foliage). The leaves are dark green when mature and generally shiny on top, and have a smell resembling almonds when crushed; these are poisonous to eat, but not to handle. The flowers are small (1–5 mm), white, produced on racemes in the spring. The fruit is a cherry 12–25 mm in diameter, sweet in taste, with little flesh surrounding the smooth seed.

Subspecies
There are two subspecies:
P. ilcifolia subsp. ilicifolia - mainland California and Baja California, red fruit 12–18 mm diameter
P. ilicifolia subsp. lyonii (Eastw.) Raven - Catalina cherry,  Channel Islands of California (San Clemente, Santa Catalina, Santa Cruz and Santa Rosa Island islands), blue-black fruit 15–25 mm diameter

Distribution and habitat 
Prunus ilicifolia is native to California chaparral and foothill woodlands along the Coast Ranges below . Its distribution extends from northern Baja California along the California coast to the northernmost extent of the Coast Ranges, as well as into the desert chaparral areas of the Mojave desert. In chaparral communities, it tends to inhabit north-facing slopes, erosion channels, or other moist, cool sites. This is the only species of the genus Prunus native to California's Santa Monica Mountains, which divide the Los Angeles Basin from the San Fernando Valley.

It is a persistent member of chaparral communities, being slow-growing but long-lived; common chaparral flora associates are toyon, western poison-oak and coffeeberry. In the absence of fire, P. ilicifolia will outlive or outshade surrounding vegetation, making room for seedlings. Eventually, it will form extensive stands codominated by scrub oak.

Ecology 

Although it will resprout from the stump after fires, the seeds are not fire-adapted like those of many other chaparral plants. Instead, it relies on the natural death of surrounding vegetation during long periods of fire-free conditions to make room for its seedlings.

Though the seeds are often reported to require sunlight to germinate, germination rates of nearly 100% have been achieved with wild-collected seed buried completely in pots with a peatlite mix.

The caterpillars of the pale swallowtail (Papilio eurymedon) feed on this and other members of the riparian woodland plant community.  It is also a larval host to the California hairstreak, Lorquin's admiral, Nevada buckmoth, and tiger swallowtail. Bees are attracted to it.

Cultivation
Prunus ilicifolia is used in California native plants and wildlife gardens, and drought-tolerant sustainable landscaping.

Uses
The pulp of the cherry is edible. Native Americans fermented the fruit into an intoxicating drink. Some also cracked the dried cherries and made meal from the seeds after grinding and leaching them. It has also been made into jam.

References

External links
 
 
 
 Desert-Tropicals: Hollyleaf Cherry (Prunus ilicifolia) access date March 26, 2010

ilicifolia
Flora of California
Flora of Baja California
Flora of Baja California Sur
Natural history of the California chaparral and woodlands
Natural history of the California Coast Ranges
Natural history of the Channel Islands of California
Natural history of the Mojave Desert
Natural history of the Peninsular Ranges
Natural history of the San Francisco Bay Area
Natural history of the Santa Monica Mountains
Natural history of the Transverse Ranges
Trees of Mediterranean climate
Drought-tolerant trees
Garden plants of North America
Butterfly food plants
Plants described in 1839
Desert fruits